Ancient Apocalypse is a 2022 documentary series about the pseudoarchaeological conspiracy theories of British writer Graham Hancock.

Synopsis 
In the series, Hancock argues that an advanced ice age civilization was destroyed in a cataclysm, but that its survivors introduced agriculture, monumental architecture and astronomy to hunter-gatherers around the world. He attempts to show how several ancient monuments are evidence of this, and claims that archaeologists are ignoring or covering-up this alleged evidence. It incorporates ideas from the Comet Research Group, including the controversial Younger Dryas impact hypothesis, which attributes climate change at the end of the Pleistocene to a massive meteor bombardment.

Production and release 
The series was produced by ITN Productions, and released by Netflix on 10 November 2022. Hancock's son Sean Hancock is "senior manager of unscripted originals" at Netflix.

It was the second most-watched series on Netflix in its week of release.

Episodes

Reception 

Archaeologists and other experts have described the theories presented in the series as lacking in evidence and easily disproven. The Society for American Archaeology objected to the classification of the series as a documentary and requested that Netflix reclassify it as science fiction, stating that it:

Archaeologist Flint Dibble said the show is "lacking in evidence to support Hancock's theory", while there is "a plethora of evidence" which contradicts the dates Hancock gives. John Hoopes, an archaeologist who has written about pseudoarcheology, said the series fails to present alternative interpretations or evidence contradicting Hancock. In the same vein, archaeologist Julien Riel-Salvatore argues that it is rather simple, from a scientific point of view, to demonstrate that the main theses of Ancient Apocalypse are false. He also believes that the series impairs the ability to discern the true from the biased, the credible from the false. David Connolly, an archaeologist and founder of the website British Archaeological Jobs & Resources, said that Hancock's work relied on cherry-picked evidence for his claims, noting, "So what he'll do is take a piece of real research [by others], insert a piece of 'why not?' and then finish it off with a bit of real research [by others]".

Answering Hancock's claims of a coverup, an article in Slate noted that archaeologists would be thrilled to uncover an ice age civilization, if the evidence really existed. Courrier international calls it dubious that Hancock's assertions are never questioned on screen: in Ancient Apocalypse, he calls the archaeologists "pseudo-experts" and repeats that they treat him patronizingly, but he never quotes their names nor their arguments. Writing in the Guardian, Stuart Heritage suggested that Netflix had "gone out of its way to court the conspiracy theorists" with the series, speculating that Hancock's sons role as head of unscripted originals at the company may explain why it was commissioned.

In one episode, Hancock says the Megalithic Temples of Malta, built in 3600–2500 BC, were actually built during the last ice age. Maltese archaeologists dismissed these claims. Experts in Pacific geography and archaeology have characterised Hancock's claims about Nan Madol as "incredibly insulting to the ancestors of the Pohnpeian [islanders] that did create these structures", linking them to 19th century "racist" and "white supremacist" ideologies. Two archaeologists that were featured in the series, Katya Stroud, a senior curator at Heritage Malta, and Necmi Karul, the director of excavations at Göbekli Tepe, said that their interviews were manipulated and presented out of context.

Writing in The Spectator, James Delingpole described himself as a "huge fan of Hancock" who finds his ideas plausible, but criticised the series' production for "continually reminding [the viewer] that this is niche, crazy stuff that respectable 'experts' shun" and for portraying Hancock as "slippery and unreliable".

See also 
 Archaeology and racism

References

External links

2022 British television series debuts
2020s British documentary television series
English-language Netflix original programming
Fringe theories
Netflix original documentary television series
Pseudoarchaeology
Archaeology and racism